Oval is a census-designated place (CDP) in Limestone Township, Lycoming County, Pennsylvania, United States. As of the 2010 census, it had a population of 361. Oval is not a separately incorporated community, but is a part of Limestone Township (which is a municipality under Pennsylvania law).

Oval is on Pennsylvania Route 44 in the north-central part of Limestone Township, in southwest Lycoming County. PA-44 leads northwest  to Jersey Shore and U.S. Route 220, and southeast over North White Deer Ridge  to Allenwood and U.S. Route 15.

It is in the eastern part of the Nippenose Valley and is drained by tributaries of Antes Creek, a northwest-flowing tributary of the West Branch Susquehanna River.

Demographics

References

Census-designated places in Lycoming County, Pennsylvania
Census-designated places in Pennsylvania